Ballyhaise College is an agricultural college, in Ballyhaise, County Cavan, run by Teagasc, with over 400 students. It was founded in 1906 at the former Ballyhaise House, the house is over 300 years old, the estate consists of 220 hectares of grassland and woodland.

The college specialises in training students for Forestry and Agricultural Industry. In recent years the college has developed close contacts with Dundalk Institute of Technology(DKIT) allowing students to achieve HETAC validated courses, and progression to further study.

The entrepreneur Denis O'Donnell from Kerry attended the college as did the TV personality, entrepreneur, and former presidential candidate Seán Gallagher.

Facilities
The college farm includes 50 hectares of woodland also kept on the farm is a dairy herd, other cattle, sheep and pigs. A large gym is used for sports, and there is a recreational area and computer facilities. Some student accommodation is also available.

References

Educational institutions established in 1906
Further education colleges in the Republic of Ireland
Agricultural universities and colleges in Ireland
Secondary schools in County Cavan
1906 establishments in Ireland